Marina Leonidova (born 17 August 1958) is a Russian former pair skater who represented the Soviet Union with Vladimir Bogolyubov. Coached by Tamara Moskvina and Tatiana Tarasova, they were three-time Prize of Moscow News bronze medalists and two-time Soviet national bronze medalists. The pair placed fourth at the 1975 European Championships in Copenhagen and fifth at the 1975 World Championships in Colorado Springs, Colorado. They also competed at the 1976 Winter Olympics in Innsbruck and finished ninth.

Competitive highlights 
(with Bogolyubov)

1974 Spartakiada results were used for Soviet Nationals results

References 

1958 births
Russian female pair skaters
Soviet female pair skaters
Living people
Figure skaters from Saint Petersburg
Figure skaters at the 1976 Winter Olympics
Olympic figure skaters of the Soviet Union